Urch is an English-language surname that may be derived from Urchfont, a village in Wiltshire.  Variant spellings include Ullrich, Ulrich and Ulrik. It may refer to:

 Callum Urch (born 1984), Australian rules footballer
 Edith Urch (1915–1978), English nurse and charity worker
 Reginald Urch (1884–1945), English author and journalist
 Tyrone Urch (born 1965), British army officer

References